The Opémisca River is a tributary of the Chibougamau River, flowing into the regional County Municipality (RCM) of Eeyou Istchee Baie-James, within the administrative region of Nord-du-Québec, province of Quebec, Canada. The course of the river crosses the townships of Cuvier and Rageot.

The hydrographic slope of the Opémisca River is accessible by a forest road on the North shore of Opémisca Lake and connecting South to route 113 which connects Lebel-sur-Quévillon to Chibougamau and passes South of the lake.

The surface of the Opémisca River is usually frozen from early November to mid-May, however, safe ice circulation is generally from mid-November to mid-April.

Geography

Toponymy 
Of Cree origin, this hydronym means "the river of sandy shrubs".

The toponym "Opémisca River" was formalized on December 5, 1968, at the Commission de toponymie du Québec, i.e. at the creation of this commission

References

See also 

Rivers of Nord-du-Québec
Nottaway River drainage basin
Eeyou Istchee James Bay